Peter Silva (born 29 June 1964) is a Brazilian boxer. He competed in the men's light middleweight event at the 1988 Summer Olympics.

References

1964 births
Living people
Brazilian male boxers
Olympic boxers of Brazil
Boxers at the 1988 Summer Olympics
Sportspeople from São Paulo
Light-middleweight boxers